Taylor Springs, also known as Taylor Springs Mill, is a historic home located near Harrisonburg, Rockingham County, Virginia. It was built about 1850, and is a two-story, five bay, brick I-house dwelling with a gable roof. Significant additions were made to the dwelling and the front porch reconstructed in the 1940s.  Also on the property are the limestone spring house (1940); a frame office or kitchen that has an exterior end chimney; and a relocated frame storage shed that used to be the kitchen wing to the house.

It was listed on the National Register of Historic Places in 2002.

References

Houses on the National Register of Historic Places in Virginia
Houses completed in 1850
Houses in Rockingham County, Virginia
National Register of Historic Places in Rockingham County, Virginia